Lucy Wainwright may refer to:

 The maiden name of British sprint canoer Lucy Hardy
 Lucy Wainwright Roche,  American singer-songwriter, daughter of musicians Loudon Wainwright III and Suzzy Roche